Craig Heller is an American television soap opera script writer.

Heller has worked as a scriptwriter on the following series:

As the World Turns (2001–2004)
Full House
General Hospital
Guiding Light (1997–2000; 2004–2005)
Happy Days
Jailbirds
Return to Green Acres

Awards and nominations
Daytime Emmy Award
Nomination, 1998, Best Writing, General Hospital
Win, 1999, Best Writing, General Hospital
Nomination, 2000, Best Writing, General Hospital
Win, 2002, Best Writing, As the World Turns
Nomination, 2003, Best Writing, As the World Turns
Win, 2004, Best Writing, As the World Turns
Win, 2005, Best Writing, As the World Turns

Writers Guild of America Award
Win, 1997, Best Writing, General Hospital
Nomination, 1998, Best Writing, General Hospital

External links

American soap opera writers
Year of birth missing (living people)
Writers Guild of America Award winners
Living people